Oh, God! You Devil is a 1984 American comedy film starring George Burns, Ted Wass, Ron Silver and Roxanne Hart. Directed by Paul Bogart and produced by Robert M. Sherman, the screenplay is by Andrew Bergman. Oh, God! You Devil is the third and final installment in the Oh, God! film series, following Oh, God! (1977) and Oh, God! Book II (1980), based on the 1971 novel of the same title by Avery Corman.

George Burns received a Saturn Award nomination for Best Actor for his performance.

Plot
Burns plays the dual roles of both God and the Devil. The Devil, using the name Harry O. Tophet (Tophet is a Hebrew word for "Hell"), is a lively character, taking pleasure in petty acts of PG-rated malice, such as making a waiter fall into a pool.

The movie tells the story of a struggling rock musician/songwriter, Bobby Shelton (played by Wass), who cannot get a break. Bobby, desperate to support his wife, Wendy (Roxanne Hart), and start a family, muses that he would sell his soul to the Devil to get ahead. The Devil begins to appear to Bobby as a prospective agent and offers Shelton a deal—seven years of unprecedented fame and fortune. Shelton balks at the deal and so Tophet renegotiates claiming that it will be for a "trial period", urging Bobby to leave his earnest agent Charlie (Eugene Roche). Shelton signs the document, but his signature transforms into that of established rock star Billy Wayne (Robert Desiderio), the last person to whom Tophet offered this deal, and soon after Bobby realizes that he has sold his soul to the Devil.

Shelton discovers that, though he now has the big success he wanted after a mammoth concert tour, he has lost his identity—he is now Billy Wayne. As such, his family is now someone else's—the former Billy Wayne, whose life Tophet now controls and who has assumed Bobby's identity. He also discovers that his wife is pregnant with his child. Realizing that he is trapped, Bobby asks for help from God, who has been watching over him, finally succeeding when, as Billy Wayne, he travels to Las Vegas for important shows. God appears after Bobby has "the Lord" paged in a hotel lobby and offers to help.

During a climactic poker game between God and the Devil over Bobby's soul, God raises the stakes while Bobby under Tophet's machinations attempts suicide. God claims that if he loses, in addition to Bobby's soul, he will stop protecting all those on "his list". If God wins, the Devil would be prevented from meddling with any of those on the list, even if they beg for his assistance. Considering the loss too high, Tophet folds, and finds that God had been bluffing, winning by, in God's words, "I put the fear of ME in YOU", and that part of the reason he had intervened for Bobby was because the Devil had become too arrogant and cocky.

Bobby rises from the floor of the dressing room and slips away as staffers discover the corpse of Billy Wayne, who had committed suicide. In the end, God meets with Bobby and tells him about how his father once prayed for him when he was a sick child, and that since then, God has kept his eye on him. After warning Bobby that the next time he will not bail him out, Shelton returns to happiness in a simple life with his loving wife and daughter. Years later, his daughter becomes sick and Bobby says the same prayer that his father did. The film ends with Bobby, God, and the spirit of Bobby's father singing to his daughter the same song Bobby's father used to sing to him, "Fugue for Tinhorns" from the musical Guys and Dolls.

Cast
 George Burns as God and the Devil (Harry O. Tophet)
 Ted Wass as Bobby Shelton
 Ron Silver as Gary Frantz
 Roxanne Hart as Wendy Shelton
 Eugene Roche as Charlie Gray
 Janet Brandt as Mrs. K
 Robert Desiderio as Billy Wayne
 John Doolittle as Arthur Shelton
 Julie Lloyd as Bea Shelton
 Belita Moreno as Mrs. Vega
 Jason Wingreen as hotel manager
 Susan Peretz as Louise
 Robert Picardo as Joe Ortiz
 Arthur Malet as houseman
 James Cromwell as priest
 Arnold Johnson as preacher
 Brandy Gold as Bobby's daughter
 Lois Wilde as casino patron (uncredited)

Production
After the success of Oh God! Warner Bros. approached other writers for sequels. They commissioned Josh Greenfield to write one and Andrew Bergman another. Bergman rewrote a play he had on his shelf about a songwriter who sells his soul to the devil: "Not a good play, but it was there sitting on my shelf. For me it was just an attempt to salvage something that I thought was a cute idea and was going nowhere. Also, I wanted to work with George Burns. This to me was linking up with a previous era of comedy... George was just the most fantastic person. He's so smart. Every single thing he said was funny".

Reception
Based on 11 reviews, the film has a 36% rating on Rotten Tomatoes.

References

External links

 
 

1984 comedy films
1984 films
1980s fantasy comedy films
American fantasy comedy films
American sequel films
The Devil in film
Films about God
Films about music and musicians
Films based on American novels
Films based on fantasy novels
Films directed by Paul Bogart
Films scored by David Shire
Films set in Los Angeles
Warner Bros. films
Works based on the Faust legend
Films with screenplays by Andrew Bergman
1980s English-language films
1980s American films